E52 may refer to:
BMW E52, an automobile platform was the basis for the 2000 through 2004 Z8 convertible sports car
HMS E52, a 1915 British E class submarine
Nokia E52, a smartphone from the Nokia Eseries range
Shin-Tōmei Expressway (Shimizu Spur road) and Chūbu-Ōdan Expressway (includes concurrency section with Chūō Expressway), route E52 in Japan